Ernst Julius Amberg (6 September 1871 in Zurich – 15 March 1952) was a Swiss mathematician and mountain climber. He is noteworthy as a mountain climber and as one of the organizers of the first International Congress of Mathematicians held in Zürich in 1897.

Biography
Amberg studied mathematics at ETH Zurich with a Lehrerdiplom (teaching diploma) in 1894. He received his doctorate in 1897 from the University of Zurich. His dissertation Über einen Körper, dessen Zahlen sich rational aus zwei Quadratwurzeln zusammensetzen (On a field whose elements have the form  , where  are rational numbers) was supervised by Adolf Hurwitz. As an assistant at ETH Zurich, Amberg was one of the members of the organizing committee of the first International Congress of Mathematicians. In May 1897 he joined a subcommittee that selected plenary speakers. Other members of the subcommittee were Hurwitz, Hermann Minkowski, Karl Geiser and Jérôme Franel. When Johann Jakob Rebstein (because of military service) resigned as the organizing committee's German-language secretary, Amberg replaced him.

After leaving ETH Zurich, he become a teacher at the Kantonsschule in Frauenfeld (in canton Thurgau). He was from 1903 to 1938 a mathematics teacher (as Walter Gröbli’s successor) at the Gymnasium in Zurich, as well as the Gymnasium’s director from 1916 to 1938 (when he retired).

During WW II, he was a substitute teacher in various Swiss Gymnasiums. In addition to his school duties, he worked as an actuary for insurance and reinsurance companies. His dissertation seems to be his only published mathematical research, although he did write about actuarial mathematics and mathematics education.

He was a keen mountaineer and headed the Zurich section of the Swiss Alpine Club for six years.

Amberg was married but had no children.

References

19th-century Swiss mathematicians
20th-century Swiss mathematicians
ETH Zurich alumni
University of Zurich alumni
Academic staff of ETH Zurich
Swiss mountain climbers
1871 births
1952 deaths